Helga Liné (born Helga Lina Stern on 14 July 1932) is a German-born Portuguese-Spanish-American film actress and circus acrobat best known for her work in the horror genre of film. She made 132 appearances mostly in film between 1941 and 2006, with most of her work being in Spanish cinema.

Biography
Helga Liné was born Helga Lina Stern on 14 July 1932 in Berlin, Germany. During the Nazi regime she fled Germany at a young age with her family, and took refuge in Portugal. At the age of just 9 she made her first film appearance there in the film Porto de Abrigo. Helga was a dancer and acrobat in circus performances in Portugal throughout the 1940s and later became a model.

In the 1950s she made further film appearances, but her career took off after she moved to Madrid in 1960. From this point, the red-headed actress made many appearances in the 1960s, particularly in horror and action films. She also starred in the spaghetti westerns In a Colt's Shadow (1965) and Have a Good Funeral, My Friend... Sartana Will Pay (1970). Although she appeared in giallo films such as So Sweet... So Perverse (1969), My Dear Killer (1972), Alta tensión (1972) and Red Rings of Fear (1978), she is best known for her horror film work. She appeared opposite Barbara Steele in Nightmare Castle (1965), and then starred as the spy Natasha in the Gothic feature Horror Express (1972), in the title role in The Loreley's Grasp, aka When the Screaming Stops (1973), as a vampire countess in the erotic film The Vampires Night Orgy (1973), and as the leader of a Satanic cult in Black Candles (1982). She also starred opposite Spanish horror actor Paul Naschy in Horror Rises from the Tomb and The Mummy's Revenge in 1973, and appeared in the 1974 Peter Fonda film Open Season.

Later she would go on to work under Pedro Almodóvar in films such as Labyrinth of Passion in 1982 and Law of Desire in 1986. She also took part in the popular Spanish TV series Verano azul in the early eighties, as a secondary character.

Selected filmography

 Kill or Be Killed (1950)
 La trinca del aire (1951)
 The Great Galeoto (1951)
 The Twin Girls (1963)
Rocío from La Mancha (1963)
The Blancheville Monster (1963)
 Triumph of the Ten Gladiators (1964)
 Gladiators Seven (1964)
Hercules and the Tyrants of Babylon (1964)
Goliath at the Conquest of Damascus (1965)
Nightmare Castle (1965)
Agent 077: Mission Bloody Mary (1965)
In a Colt's Shadow (1965)
The Murderer with the Silk Scarf (1966)
Weekend, Italian Style (1966)
Special Mission Lady Chaplin (1966)
Kriminal (1966)
Password: Kill Agent Gordon (1966)
 Avenger X (1967) 
 Il marchio di Kriminal (1967)
 Brutti di notte (1968)
So Sweet... So Perverse (1969)
Churchill's Leopards (1970)
Have a Good Funeral, My Friend... Sartana Will Pay (1970)
Alta tensión (1972)

My Dear Killer (1972)
Horror Express (1972)
Holy God, Here Comes the Passatore! (1973)
Those Dirty Dogs (1973)
Horror Rises from the Tomb (1973)
War Goddess (1973)
The Mummy's Revenge (1973)
 No es bueno que el hombre esté solo (1973) as Mónica
The Loreley's Grasp (1973)
The Vampires Night Orgy (1973)
 Dick Turpin (1974)
Open Season (1974)
Death Will Have Your Eyes (1974)
 Death's Newlyweds (1975)
The More It Goes, the Less It Goes (1977)
China 9, Liberty 37 (1978)
Red Rings of Fear (1978)
 Father Cami's Wedding (1979)
Stigma (1980)
Madame Olga's Pupils (1981)
Black Candles (1982)
Labyrinth of Passion (1982)
Black Venus (1983)
 The Cheerful Colsada Girls (1984)
Law of Desire (1986)

External links 

 

German film actresses
German child actresses
Spanish film actresses
Spanish child actresses
Spanish vedettes
German emigrants to Spain
1932 births
Living people
Acrobats
Actresses from Berlin